is a 1986 video game software developed and published by Hudson Soft exclusively in Japan for the Nintendo Family Computer. It is based on Fujiko Fujio A's (pen name of Motoo Abiko) Japanese manga series of the same name, which later became an anime series and Asian franchise. The game was released around the same time the anime was aired. It was the fifth best selling Famicom game released in 1986, selling approximately 1,500,000 copies in its lifetime.

Description

Plot
The plot begins when a young ninja name Kanzo Hattori is searching for his master in order to complete his training. While searching for his master, he encounters a young 10-year-old boy named Ken'ichi Mitsuba and makes him his temporary replacement master. In order to develop Ken'ichi's confidence,  they went on many adventures together. The game was aimed at a young audience the same way that the manga and anime did.

Gameplay
In the game, player controls Kanzo Hattori in a side-scrolling action game. Hattori must run to the right over various terrains, but primarily through the woods. In addition to using throwing stars, Hattori can access one of the other ninja techniques (ninpou), like Kagebashin, Happou no Shuriken, etc. In fact, he learns a total of 11 ninpou; however, he must first collect scrolls that provide those abilities before he can use them. Due to sluggish controls, it can be difficult to clear some of the obstacles that he will face without the ninja abilities to enhance his mobility.

References

1986 video games
Hudson Soft games
Japan-exclusive video games
Video games about ninja
Nintendo Entertainment System games
Nintendo Entertainment System-only games
Video games based on anime and manga
Video games developed in Japan
Video games scored by Takeaki Kunimoto
Ninja Hattori-kun